Christian Schreiber may refer to:
Christian Schreiber (philosopher) (1781–1857)
Christian Schreiber (footballer) (born 1977), Austrian footballer
Christian Schreiber (rower) (born 1980), German rower